The 2020 Euroformula Open Championship was a multi-event motor racing championship for single-seater open wheel formula racing cars that was held across Europe. The championship featured drivers competing in the new Dallara 320 car, which features the Halo safety device. It was the seventh Euroformula Open Championship season.

CryptoTower Racing Team driver Ye Yifei won the title after the second race at Barcelona, having won 11 races, 13 pole positions, 12 fastest lap.

Teams and drivers
All teams utilized the new Dallara 320 chassis.

 Kris Wright was scheduled to compete with Fortec Motorsport but neither him or the team appeared at any rounds.

Race calendar
A nine-round provisional calendar was revealed on 11 October 2019.  While Silverstone Circuit is not on this season's calendar, Autodromo di Pergusa is scheduled to debut as a Euroformula Open Championship round.  An updated calendar was announced on 22 October 2019.

After the start of the season was delayed due to the 2019-20 coronavirus pandemic, a new 8-round calendar was announced on 21 May 2020.  The round at Circuit de Pau-Ville, which was on the original schedule, was not run this season.  On 3 June 2020 it was announced that the season opener at Hungaroring was moved back to 23–26 July.  On 10 June 2020 the season opener was moved to 8–9 August, while the round at Autodromo di Pergusa was cancelled with plans to run there in 2021. Two of the eight rescheduled events will hold three races to compensate for the loss of one round. On 22 October, the planned season finale at Jarama was cancelled due to rising COVID-19 cases in Europe, and it was announced that Barcelona would hold four races instead.

Championship standings

Drivers' championship 

 Points were awarded as follows:

Only the fifteen best race results counted towards the championship.

Rookies' championship 

 Points were awarded as follows:

Teams' championship 
 Points were awarded as follows:

Notes

References

External links
 

Euroformula Open Championship seasons
Euroformula Open
Euroformula Open